HRC: State Secrets and the Rebirth of Hillary Clinton is a 2014 book by two Washington-based reporters, Amie Parnes and Jonathan Allen, about the tenure of Hillary Rodham Clinton (hence the 'HRC' of the title) as United States Secretary of State and about how she recovered politically from her loss in the 2008 Democratic presidential primaries.

The book was particularly noted by the media for saying that Clinton and her husband, former President Bill Clinton, compiled a "hit list" of individuals who were viewed as having had been unhelpful during her 2008 presidential campaign.

In 2017 the same authors published Shattered: Inside Hillary Clinton's Doomed Campaign, about Clinton's loss in the 2016 United States presidential election.

The list
Parnes and Allen claim the hit list was created so that "Friends could be rewarded, and enemies punished". In the last days of Clinton's 2008 campaign many became convinced that she had failed in part because of the lack of support from those that the Clintons, especially Bill Clinton, had helped in the past. Staff compiled a list of Democratic Party politicians and figures who had remained true and those who had turned against them. Listed persons were ranked from 1 to 7, with 7 being reserved for those perceived to be the greatest betrayers.

Reception
Media took interest in the "enemies list," but reviews of the book were largely negative, criticizing it as overly praiseful of Clinton  with few new insights. The New York Times wrote: "Their Clinton is the stock version, Democratic edition: gracious in defeat and fearless in negotiation, almost perfectly in sync with Obama, rarely making wrong bets despite choices of bewildering complexity."

Reviews

See also
Nixon's Enemies List

References

External links

Books about Hillary Clinton
Books about Bill Clinton
2014 non-fiction books
American political books
2008 United States presidential election in popular culture
Collaborative non-fiction books
Crown Publishing Group books